Renata Gustaitytė (born 7 April 1974) is a Lithuanian athlete. She competed in the women's discus throw at the 2000 Summer Olympics.

References

External links
 

1974 births
Living people
Athletes (track and field) at the 2000 Summer Olympics
Lithuanian female discus throwers
Olympic athletes of Lithuania
Place of birth missing (living people)